Elena Bogdan and Mihaela Buzărnescu were the defending champions, but decided not to participate this year.

Bianca Andreescu and Carol Zhao won the title after Francesca Di Lorenzo and Erin Routliffe gave them a walkover in the final because of an injury.

Seeds

Draw

References
Main Draw

Challenger Banque Nationale de Saguenay
Challenger de Saguenay